Pelechy is a municipality and village in Domažlice District in the Plzeň Region of the Czech Republic. It has about 80 inhabitants.

History
The first written mention of Pelechy is from 1789. The village was founded between 1768 and 1789.

References

Villages in Domažlice District